Julie Gross (born 27 March 1957) is a retired Australian women's basketball player.

Biography

Gross played for the national team during the 1970s, competing for Australia at two World Championships; 1975 held in Columbia and 1979 held in South Korea.

In 1978, Gross moved to the United States where she played basketball for Louisiana State University. In her first season with the Tigers, Gross became LSU's first Kodak All-American. Gross finished her career as the all-time leading rebounder in LSU history with 1,466 rebounds and was second on the all-time scoring list with 2,488 points. Gross and Maree Bennie (now Jackson), were the first Australian females to win All-American honours while playing college basketball in the United States.

LSU statistics
Source

References

1957 births
Living people
Australian women's basketball players
LSU Lady Tigers basketball players
Australian expatriate basketball people in the United States